Mama's Gun is the second studio album by American singer Erykah Badu. It was recorded between 1999 and 2000 at Electric Lady Studios in New York and released on November 21, 2000, by Motown Records. A neo soul album, Mama's Gun incorporates elements of funk, soul, and jazz styles. It has confessional lyrics by Badu, which cover themes of insecurity, personal relationships, and social issues. The album has been viewed by critics as a female companion to neo soul artist D'Angelo's second album Voodoo (2000), which features a similar musical style and direction. Critics have also noted that while Badu's first album Baduizm contained its share of cryptic lyricism, Mama's Gun is much more direct in its approach, and places the artist in a subjective position more than its predecessor.

The album contains the single "Bag Lady", Badu's first top 10 Billboard hit, which was also nominated for the Grammy Award for Best Female R&B Vocal Performance and for Best R&B Song. The song "Didn't Cha Know?" was also nominated for Best R&B Song. The album features substantial contributions from several members of the Soulquarians outfit, of which Badu was a member. It also features guests such as soul singer Betty Wright and trumpeter Roy Hargrove. Mama's Gun was met with generally positive reviews from critics. It was less commercially successful than Baduizm, receiving Platinum certification in the US. Rolling Stone magazine named it one of the Top 10 Albums of 2000.

Background 
Following Badu signing to Universal Records, she released her debut studio album Baduizm, in early 1997. The album was met with critical and commercial success, debuting at number two on the Billboard charts and number one on the US Billboard Top R&B/Hip-Hop Albums. Baduizms commercial and critical success helped establish Badu as one of the emerging neo soul genre's leading artists. Her particular style of singing drew many comparisons to Billie Holiday. 
Baduizm was certified three times platinum by the Recording Industry Association of America, Gold by the British Phonographic Industry and the Canadian Recording Industry Association.

Badu recorded her first live album, while pregnant with Seven, and the release of the recording coincided with his birth.

Recording

After the success of Baduizm and Live, Badu took a short break to tend to her role as a mother to her newborn child, Seven, whom she had with her partner at the time, André Benjamin. She returned to collaborating with Questlove of The Roots. The frequency of their collaborations led to her becoming a member of the Soulquarians - a collective formed of like-minded musicians, singers and rappers including Questlove, D'Angelo, Jay Dee, and Common (with whom she had previously worked in 1997). Unfortunately, by the time the songs for her follow-up album had begun to materialize, her spousal relationship with Benjamin had already broken down. Badu used the experience as inspiration for several of the songs that she would write, most notably "Green Eyes". Another event, the murder of Amadou Diallo by New York City Police, serves as the basis for the song "A.D. 2000".

As with other Soulquarian collaborations, the majority of the album was recorded at Electric Lady, Jimi Hendrix's personal recording studio, which was also used to create several landmark albums by David Bowie, Stevie Wonder, and John Lennon. Other studios include Dallas Sound Lab and Palmyra Studios in her hometown of Dallas, TX. The sessions were informal, and took place simultaneously with D'Angelo's Voodoo and Common's Like Water for Chocolate, resulting in impromptu collaborations and a distinctive sound that can be found among the three albums. Renowned recording engineer, Russell Elevado, who was responsible for the mixing of all three albums, has stated that he used older techniques and vintage mixing gear in order to achieve the warmth found in older recordings. While most current recording techniques involve the use of hi-tech digital equipment, Elevado employed the use of analog equipment including vintage microphones and recording to tape.

Release and reception

Mama's Gun was released by Motown Records on November 21, 2000, and received generally positive reviews from critics. At Metacritic, which assigns a normalized rating out of 100 to reviews from mainstream publications, the album received an average score of 80, based on 16 reviews. Rolling Stone magazine's Touré said Badu abandoned the pretensions of Baduizm in favor of equally profound but more comprehensible lyrics. In The Village Voice, Robert Christgau wrote that she improved her ability as a composer on Mama's Gun and also took note of her lyrics: "Maybe her sources are autobiographical, but she’s here to inspire all black-identified women and the men who admire them." The A.V. Clubs Keith Phipps praised her lyrical themes and the album's "deceptively simple arrangements, a lovely breakup suite ('Green Eyes'), and near-infinite replay value". PopMatters critic Wayne Franklin found the record compelling in its personal scope of Badu's psyche, calling it "a definite work of art, destined to remain in heavy rotation for some time to come".

Although most reviews were favorable, Mama's Gun was not as successful with consumers and critics as Baduizm had been; Q wrote that Badu's debut had raised expectations she did not meet on Mama's Gun, while Entertainment Weekly said it was plagued by "a reactionary pseudo-sophistication that too often substitutes good taste for good tunes." According to Badu in an interview a few months after the album's release, "it has sold 1.4 million in the US. So no, it didn't sell as much ... although creatively I feel like this is a better piece of work." She felt disappointed at first about its commercial performance, but was encouraged by the response from listeners at her concerts: "When I started to tour again and saw all the people show up who knew the words, it was confirmation that the work is not always for commercial success. It's also for spiritual upliftment."

At the end of 2000, Mama's Gun was voted the 15th best album of the year in the Pazz & Jop, an annual poll of American critics published by The Village Voice. Christgau, the poll's supervisor, ranked it ninth best on his own year-end list. The Times named it the ninth best record of the year. It was also ranked ninth by Rolling Stone, while Jon Pareles named it the year's fifth best album in his list for The New York Times. The newspaper's Ben Ratliff later said Mama's Gun and D'Angelo's Voodoo were "the great neo-soul records of 2000".  The album was also included in the book 1001 Albums You Must Hear Before You Die.  In the 2020 reboot of their list of 'The 500 Greatest Albums of All Time', Rolling Stone ranked Mama's Gun at number 158.

Track listing 

Notes
  indicates a co-producer.

Personnel

Musicians
 Erykah Badu – vocals, acoustic guitar (track 9), MPC2000 drum machine (12)
 James Poyser – piano, Rhodes electric piano, Minimoog, organ, clavinet, Arp String Ensemble (tracks 1–5, 7–9, 14)
 Pino Palladino – bass (1, 5, 9, 14)
 Jay Dee – programming (2), drum programming (3), bass (7, 8)
 Ahmir "Questlove" Thompson – drums (1, 4, 5, 7–9, 14)
 Leonard "Doc" Gibbs – percussion (5, 7, 8)
 Shaun Martin – keyboards (6, 10, 12, 13)
 Braylon Lacy – bass (6, 10, 12, 13)
 Gino Lock Johnson Iglehart – drums (6, 10, 12, 13)
 Yahzarah – background vocals (1, 2, 6, 10–12)
 N'dambi and Geno "Junebugg" Young – background vocals (6, 10, 12)
 Chinah Blac – background vocals (1)
 Jef Lee Johnson – guitar (1), additional acoustic guitar (9)
 Roy Ayers – vibraphone (5)
 Russell Elevado – guitar (8)
 Betty Wright – background vocals (8), additional vocals (9)
 Stephen Marley – vocals (11)
 Dready – bass, acoustic guitar (11)
 Ramone Gonzalez – percussion (12)
 R.C. Williams – keyboards (13)
 Carlos Henderson – acoustic bass (14)
Horns arranged by Roy Hargrove:
 Flute – D'Wayne Kerr (6, 8, 10, 12, 14)
 Saxophone – Jacques Swarzbart (7, 14)
 Trumpet – Roy Hargrove (7, 14)
 Trombone – Frank Lacy (7, 14)
Strings on tracks 3 and 13, arranged by Larry Gold:
 Violins: Charlie Parker Jr., Emma Kummrow, Gregory Teperman, Igor Szwec, Olgo Konopelsky, Charles Kwas (13 only)
 Violas: Davis Barnet, Peter Nocella
 Cello: Larry Gold (13 only)

Production
 Executive producers: Erykah Badu, Kedar Massenburg
 Recording engineers: Tom Soares (1–5, 8–20, 14), Chris Bell (4, 6, 7, 12), Russell Elevado (1, 7, 8), Leslie Brathwaite (2, 3, 5, 10), Vernon J. Mungo (2, 8, 10), Jon Smeltz and Mark Goodchild (3, 13), Errol Brown (11)
 Mixing Engineers: Tom Soares (4, 6, 9, 11), Russell Elevado (1, 7, 8, 12, 14), Leslie Brathwaite (2, 3, 5, 10, 13)
 Assistant engineers: Jon Adler (1, 3, 5, 9, 10, 14), Steve Mandel (1, 5, 7, 8, 12, 14), Shinobu Mitsuoka (2–5, 8, 9, 11), Mike Turner (3, 8, 9, 13), Michael Verdes (4, 6, 7, 12), Vincent Alexander (5, 10, 13), Mitch Getz and William Jackson (2), Krystof Zizka (3), Jason Dale (4), Brian Geten and Paul Gregory (6), Rob Smith (10)
 Erik Steiner – Pro-Tools (3, 4)
 Mastering: Chris Gehringer, Tom Coyne
 Vernon Mungo – production facilitator
 Erykah Badu and Michael Whitfield – art direction
 Simone/Whitfield – design
 Robert Maxwell – cover art
 Don Thompson – photography
 Kierstan Tucker – A&R
 Kelly Abraham - Marketing

Charts

Weekly charts

Year-end charts

Certifications

References

External links
 

2000 albums
Erykah Badu albums
Motown albums
Albums produced by Questlove
Albums produced by J Dilla
Albums produced by James Poyser
Albums recorded at Electric Lady Studios